This is a list of places on the Victorian Heritage Register in the Rural City of Ararat in Victoria, Australia. The Victorian Heritage Register is maintained by the Heritage Council of Victoria.

The Victorian Heritage Register, as of 2020, lists the following 16 state-registered places within the Rural City of Ararat:

References

Ararat
Rural City of Ararat